Simey is a surname. Notable people with the surname include:

 Cyril Simey (1905–1952), British fencer
 Margaret Simey (1906–2004), Scottish political and social campaigner
 Thomas Simey, Baron Simey (1906–1969), British academic and life peer

See also
 Simen